Stella Maris College is an institution of higher education for women in Chennai, India. It is an autonomous college affiliated to the University of Madras and is partly residential. The college, which is under the direction of the Society of the Franciscan Missionaries of Mary, is a minority institution.

It has five hostels – Snehalaya, Our Lady's, Klemens, St. Josephs and Nava Nirmana.

Introduction

Beginning in a small one-storey building on 15 August 1947, with an enrollment of 32 students, the college has at present over 5,500 students housed in large buildings on the campus of "The Cloisters", Cathedral Road, Chennai. The college became autonomous in 1987 and has 19 undergraduate and 12 postgraduate programmes. Research programmes such as M.Phil, PhD, and postgraduate diploma courses are part of the academic curriculum.

History

The college is under the management of the Institute of the Franciscan Missionaries of Mary. It was founded on 15 August 1947 with an enrollment of 32 students in the intermediate class. Stella Maris was granted permanent recognition in 1951. The college has the unique credit of having initiated bachelor's degrees in Western Music and History of Fine Arts, as well as master's degrees in Social Work and Indian Music, at the University of Madras.

Additionally, it was the first women's college in Madras to offer M.A. degree courses in English, economics, and fine arts. In 1960, the college moved from Santhome to a more spacious campus, "The Cloisters", Cathedral Road, Chennai. The following few decades saw tremendous growth and development in the college with several firsts and distinctions. The college was one of the few chosen to start the pilot project of the National Service Scheme in 1968. A spacious library was erected on the occasion of the Silver Jubilee of the college in 1972 and occupies a place of pride on the campus as well as in Chennai.

From 1978 onwards there was a shift in the admission policy, keeping in mind the thrust of the college towards social justice. Conscious of the growing need for academic freedom, the college launched into autonomy in 1987; the 1990s saw the college offering several new job-oriented courses as well as additional sections for the departments of B.Com. and mathematics. On the occasion of the Golden Jubilee, the St. Clare's Centre- a four-story building that houses the administrative offices, an audio-visual room, computer laboratories, and several classrooms- was erected. With ten years of experiential learning processes behind it, the college restructured its system of education by introducing a credit-based system in 1997, offering many new academic programmes that encourage interdisciplinary associations.

Coaching for the civil services exams was launched in November 2009. The college also conducts coaching classes for both faculty and students who are preparing to appear for the NET and SLET exams.

Departments
Advanced Zoology and Biotechnology
Bioinformatics
Biotechnology
Business Administration
Chemistry
Commerce
Computer Applications
Economics
English
History & Tourism
Information Technology
International Studies
Languages
Mathematics
Physics
Plant Biology and Plant Biotechnology
Psychology
Public Relations
Religion and Value Education
Social Work
Sociology
Visual Arts
Vocational Programmes:
Sustainable Energy Management
Food Processing and Quality Control
Diploma Courses:
Computer Science
Medical Laboratory Technology

Conservation
As of 2014, the college has undertaken around twelve environmental initiatives including light-emitting diode cluster lights, solar-powered streetlights, source segregation, vermi-composting, and waste water recycling plant. In January 2014, the college opted for green energy with the installation of a 50-kilo watt roof-top solar power plant on its campus. The plant, installed by Omega Natural Polarity Private Limited at a cost of  5 million, has 200 solar panels and caters to six percent of the total power requirement on the campus, powering lights and fans in the college.

Notable alumni

 Alarmel Valli, Indian classical dancer
 Anita Coleman, researcher
 Anju Bhargava, political operative
 Anuradha Menon, Comedian 
 Bala Devi Chandrashekar, Bharatanatyam dancer
 Brindha Sivakumar, Singer 
 Chitra Ramanathan, Contemporary Fine Artist - Painting 
 Divya Ajith Kumar, Captain Air Army Defence 
 G. Thilakavathi IPS, police officer and Tamil writer
 Geeta Menon, academic, educator; Dean of New York University
 Jayalalitha, politician-turned-actress, former Chief Minister of Tamil Nadu
 Malini Parthasarathy, editor, The Hindu
 Lekha Washington, actress
 Manjima Mohan, Indian Actress, Award winner.
 Preetha Reddy, managing director of Apollo Hospitals
 Pushpa Kandaswamy, film producer Kavithalaya Productions
 Rama Ravi, Carnatic vocalist
 Samantha Ruth Prabhu, actress
 Savitha Sastry, dancer
 Shweta Mohan, singer
 Sheela Murthy, U.S. immigration attorney

References

 
Franciscan universities and colleges
Catholic universities and colleges in India
Women's universities and colleges in Chennai
University of Madras
Educational institutions established in 1947
1947 establishments in India
Colleges affiliated to University of Madras